Bruce Waite (born 22 May 1946) is a former Australian rules footballer who played with Essendon in the Victorian Football League (VFL) during the late 1960s.

A ruckman from Albury, Waite often played in a forward pocket for Essendon. He came off the bench as a reserve in Essendon's 1965 VFL Grand Final win over St Kilda to end his debut season in a premiership team.

Waite won the Ovens and Murray Football League best and Fairest award, the Morris Medal in 1972, playing for the Myrtleford Football Club.

References

Holmesby, Russell and Main, Jim (2007). The Encyclopedia of AFL Footballers. 7th ed. Melbourne: Bas Publishing.

1946 births
Australian rules footballers from New South Wales
Essendon Football Club players
Essendon Football Club Premiership players
Albury Football Club players
Living people
One-time VFL/AFL Premiership players